Bad Haggis is a Celtic band with roots in Scottish music. The American group is led by piper Eric Rigler, who has played on dozens of movie soundtracks. A tune by Bad Haggis was used in the first season of Crossing Jordan, and pipes and whistles played by Eric Rigler are still heard regularly on the show. 

Eric Rigler has played bagpipes on several movies and is commonly regarded as "the world's most recorded piper". He also played the pipes at former President Ronald Reagan's memorial service.

Current members
 Eric Rigler - uilleann pipes, great highland bagpipes, Scottish smallpipe, tin whistle
 Mike Hoffmann - electric guitar, acoustic guitar
 Mick Linden - electric bass, vocals
 Ryan Krieger - drums
 Alberto Lopez - percussion

Past members
 Rogerio Jardim - drums, vocals
 Bryon Holley - drums, vocals

Guest members
 Rubén Blades - vocals, percussion
 Los Angeles Scots Pipe Band

Discography
 Bad Haggis (1998)
 Ark (2000)
 Trip (2001)
 Wine Dark Sea (2005)

Movie Soundtracks with either Bad Haggis or Eric Rigler
 Titanic
 Braveheart
 Austin Powers
 Troy
 Master and Commander
 Cinderella Man

External links
yahoo.com More information about the movie history of Eric Rigler and Bad Haggis
mikehoffmaNN.com Guitarist Mike Hoffmann.
hoffmannamps.com Hoffmann Amplification - Musical instrument amp builder for Bad Haggis

American folk musical groups
Celtic music groups